Kara River may refer to:

 Kara (river), a tributary of the Kara Sea in northern Russia
 Kara (Shilka), a tributary of the Shilka in Zabaykalsky Krai, eastern Russia
 Kara River (Togo)

See also 
 Kara (disambiguation)
 Karasu (disambiguation) – "Su", literally 'water', may also mean 'river' or 'stream'